Big Brother Brasil 10 was the tenth season of Big Brother Brasil. It began on January 12, 2010, and ended on March 30, 2010, on the Rede Globo television network. The show was produced by Endemol Globo and presented by the news reporter Pedro Bial. The season was officially confirmed in 2008 as part of a millionaire contract between international Endemol and Rede Globo. The prize award was R$1,500,000 without tax allowances. The winner was a 37-year-old physical education teacher, Marcelo Dourado, from Porto Alegre, Rio Grande do Sul, who won with 60% of 154,878,460 votes cast, a worldwide record. He had previously appeared on Big Brother Brasil 4, when he finished in seventh place. Anamara Barreira and Elieser Ambrosio returned to compete as veterans in Big Brother Brasil 13, where they were placed 8th and 10th respectively.

Overview
There were seventeen housemates competing for the grand prize (the first season to have an odd number of original housemates), a decrease over the previous season. The season lasted for 78 days, one week less than the previous season.

The game
Big Brother divided the housemates into five cliques of three: Sarados (the Fit), Belos (the Beautiful), Cabeças (the Nerds), Ligados (the Tunned) and Coloridos (the Colorful/Gays). The housemates played as individuals except when a housemate from a clique won Head of Household, when all members of that clique were immune from eviction. This concept was first implemented on the eleventh season of Big Brother in USA. Five previous housemates returned to support one of the cliques in the House: Joseane Oliveira of Big Brother 3 supported the Belos, Marcelo Dourado of Big Brother 4 supported the Sarados, Rafael Valente of Big Brother 6 supported the Cabeças, Fani Pacheco of Big Brother 7 supported the Coloridos and Natalia Casassola of Big Brother 8 supported the Ligados. Fernanda won the first Head of Household competition for the Belos, allowing Joseane to return to the house as a full housemate and the first Head of Household. She could also could choose one of the two male ex-housemates, either Dourado or Rafael, to enter as a full housemate, and chose Dourado.

Reunion show
The reunion was hosted by Ana Maria Braga and broadcast on April 5, 2010, on the morning news and talk show Mais Você. It was the first reunion since Season 5 and all the former housemates attended. The actresses Deborah Secco and Betty Lago, the singer Preta Gil, season 7 winner Diego Gasques and season 9 runner-up Priscila Pires were special guests.

Controversies

Anamara
A request for exemption was made on January 29, 2010, by housemate Anamara Barreira to the State Military Police was accepted and the decision was published on February 23, 2010, in the Official Gazette of Bahia. Anamara should have returned from her vacation earlier that month. Without the exemption, she would be considered a deserter and could have been imprisoned for up to two years. The application was lodged by the procurator of Anamara, Amanda Miller. According to Miller, before entering the house Anamara left the application for exemption with an attorney. With the letter of resignation, Anamara could not be considered a defector.

Dourado
Dourado caused disagreements and controversies by displaying manjis in a tattoo on his left arm, which were taken to be swastikas. He was also accused of homophobic behavior by some LGBT organizations. Dourado's adviser, Aline Antonoff, issued a press release, in which she stated that the tattoo differs from the Nazi swastika, because it is reversed, and has no connection with it, since the symbol belongs to several cultures. She also denied that the fighter is homophobic.

Elenita
After recording a post-elimination interview with Elenita for a spin-off show, broadcast by the cable channel Multishow, the season 7 winner and main host Diego Gasques criticized the former housemate on his Twitter account, commenting that the two had a fight and she was a disgusting and low level woman. He later deleted the post, but continued posting sarcastic comments about her.

A week after the incident, the season 9 runner-up, Priscila Pires, took over hosting duties from him to interview the last evicted housemate at the time, Angélica Marques.

Housemates

The cast list was unveiled on January 5, 2010.

(ages stated at time of contest)

Future appearances
In 2013, Anamara Barreira and Eliéser Ambrósio returned to compete in Big Brother Brasil 13, where they were placed 8th and 10th respectively.

In 2019, Eliéser Ambrósio appeared with his wife, Kamilla Salgado, in Power Couple Brasil season 4; they originally finished in tenth place, but they came back to the game and finished ninth.

In 2020, Claudia Colucci and Lia Khey appeared together on Big Brother Brasil 20 as models in an activity.

Voting history
The voting table below records whom each housemate voted to nominate in the diary room during his or her time in the house. The Head of Household vote (cast in front of the other housemates) automatically nominated one housemate for eviction. Then, the other housemates voted and if the vote was tied, the Head of Household broke the tie. (This type of vote counted towards the total number of nominations received.)

 Key
  – Fit
  – Beautiful
  – Colorful
  – Tunned
  – Nerds

 Note 1:  During the first three weeks, when a housemate of a clique won Head of Household, the other housemate of the same clique would also be immune from eviction.
 Note 2: For winning the first Head of Household competition for Joseane (who chose Elenita to be the first nominee), Big Brother gave an extra immunity to Fernanda.
 Note 3: For winning the Monday Night Game, Big Brother gave an extra immunity to Lia.
 Note 4: Ana Marcela answered the Big Phone and had to choose two housemates (Angelica and Tessalia) to wear red collars until the vote. On Sunday, one of them would be nominated for eviction. However, if the chosen housemate nominated her in the Diary Room, she would be nominated instead. Ana Marcela chose Tessalia to be the first nominee. Tessalia nominated Ana Marcela in the Diary Room, so Ana Marcela was automatically up for eviction.
 Note 5: Anamara answered the Big Phone and was automatically nominated for eviction.
 Note 6: The audience voted Dourado to win the "Higher Power", he could overthrow the Head of Household or the house votes or the Big Phone and replace the nominations. This power could only be used once and within the next two evictions. The twist was based on "Coup d'État" from the American Big Brother.
 Note 7: In the first round of nominations in the fourth week, the two housemates who received the most votes would be nominated along with the Head of Household vote.
 Note 8:  Dourado played his "Higher Power" and overthrew the house votes, so the four votes against him did not count. He had the casting vote and chose Eliéser (who had received his vote above) to replace him on the nomination.
 Note 9: In the second round of nominations in the fourth week, housemates could only vote in a person who lived that week in the opposite house. First, the Head of Household Michel (Poor House) automatically nominated Lia (Rich House), then the other housemates voting in public, not the Diary Room. The Rich House nominated Uilliam by a 6-1 vote, while the Poor House nominated Dourado by a 5-0 vote.
 Note 10: Anamara answered the Big Phone and was informed that she should choose two housemates (Dourado and Fernanda) to wear red collars until the vote. On Sunday, the house would give immunity to one of the two choices, and also nominate who did not receive that immunity. Anamara should have kept this secret, but she gave some clues about the meaning of the red collars, so Big Brother nominated her as a punishment.
 Note 11: Angelica answered the Big Phone and was informed that she should choose two housemates (Claudia and Sergio) to stay in the White Room together with her. The audience voted for a person who was in the White Room to win immunity and Sergio received the most votes. On Sunday, the house had to choose between sending one or two people from the White Room be automatically nominated for eviction. The house chose to send only one person (Angelica).
 Note 12: For winning the Monday Night Game, Big Brother gave an extra immunity to Dicesar.
 Note 13: Dourado answered the Big Phone and was informed that he should choose one housemate to be automatically nominated for eviction on Sunday and keep this a secret. He nominated Claudia and, therefore, he was banned from nominating with the other housemates.
 Note 14: Dicesar answered the Big Phone and was informed that he should choose two housemates (Anamara and Dourado) to stay handcuffed until the vote. On Sunday, one of the two would be automatically nominated for eviction. He nominated Dourado and, therefore, he was banned from nominating with the other housemates.
 Note 15: Lia won the eighth Power of Immunity competition. However, there was a twist, not known to the housemates, in which the winner, rather than immunize another housemate, would be immunized.
 Note 16: Dicesar answered the last Big Phone and received an extra immunity from Big Brother. However, he had to keep this secret until the vote, or he would lose that immunity.

References

External links
 Official web site 

2010 Brazilian television seasons
10